Paradycheia is a genus of polyplacophoran known from the Upper Cambrian Eminence Dolomite, Missouri, USA.

References

Prehistoric chiton genera
Cambrian molluscs
Cambrian animals of North America

Cambrian genus extinctions